The Bihar legislative assembly election, 2010 was held in six phases over a period of one month starting from 21 October until 20 November in all 243 constituencies of Bihar, India. The election is conducted to elect the government in Bihar for a five-year term. The votes were scheduled to be counted on 24 November.

Background
The Janata Dal (United) was the largest party in the Bihar legislative assembly after the 2005 election, and ruled along with the Bharatiya Janata Party as part of the National Democratic Alliance. The incumbent chief minister was Nitish Kumar.

This election also followed a surprise defeat by the once ruling Rashtriya Janata Dal in the 2009 Indian general election.

Schedule

Phase I
47 seats were voted for. The following constituencies would vote from 7:00 to 17:00:
Harlakhi, Benipatti, Khajauli, Babubarhi, Bisfi, Madhubani, Rajnagar (SC), Jhanjharpur, Phulparas, Laukaha, Nirmali, Pipra, Supaul, Triveniganj (SC), Chhatapur, Narpatganj, Raniganj (SC), Forbesganj, Araria, Jokihat, Sikti, Bahadurganj, Thakurganj, Kishanganj, Kochadhaman, Amour, Baisi, Kasba, Banmankhi (SC), Rupauli, Dhamdaha, Purnia, Katihar, Kadwa, Balrampur, Pranpur, Manihari (ST), Barari, Korha (SC), Alamnagar, Bihariganj, Singheshwar (SC), Madhepura, Sonbarsha (SC), Saharsa

The following constituencies would vote from 7:00 to 15:00:
Simri, Bakhtiarpur, Mahishi

Phase II
45 seats were voted for. The following constituencies would vote from 7:00 to 17:00:
Sheohar, Riga, Bathnaha (SC), Parihar, Sursand, Bajpatti, Sitamarhi, Runnisaidpur, Belsand, Kusheshwar Asthan (SC), Gaura Bauram, Benipur, Alinagar, Darbhanga Rural, Darbhanga, Hayaghat, Bahadurpur, Keoti, Jale, Gaighat, Aurai, Bochaha (SC), sakra (SC), Kurhani, Muzaffarpur, Kanti, Baruraj, Kalyanpur (SC), Warisnagar, Samastipur, Ujiarpur, Morwa, Sarairanjan, Mohiuddinnagar, Bibhutipur, Rosera (SC), Hasanpur, Narkatia, Pipra, Madhuban, Chiraia, Dhaka

The following constituencies would vote from 7:00 to 15:00:

Minapur, Paroo, Sahebgan

Arun Singh will Win Dhaka legislative assembly election in 2015

Phase III
48 seats were voted for. The following constituencies would vote from 7:00 to 17:00:
Narkatiaganj, Bagaha, Lauriya, Nautan, Chanpatia, Bettiah, Sikta, Raxaul, Sugauli, Harsidhi (SC), Govindganj, Kesaria, Kalyanpur, Motihari, Baikunthpur, Barauli, Gopalganj, Shahpur Patti,
Kuchaikote, Bhorey (SC), Hathua, Siwan, Ziradei, Darauli (SC), Raghunathpur, Daraundha, Barharia, Goriakothi, Maharajganj, Ekma, Manjhi, Baniapur, Taraiya, Marhaura, Chapra, Garkha (SC), Amnour, Parsa, Sonepur, Hajipur, Lalganj, Vaishali, Mahua, Raja Pakar (SC), Mahnar
The following constituencies would vote from 7:00 to 15:00:
Valmiki Nagar, Ramnagar (SC), Raghopur, Patepur (SC)

Phase IV
42 seats were voted for. The following constituencies would vote from 7:00 to 17:00:
Cheria Bariarpur, Bachhwara, Teghra, Matihani, Sahebpur Kamal, Begusarai, Bakhri (SC), Khagaria, Beldaur, Parbatta, Lakhisarai, Munger, Bihpur, Gopalpur, Pirpainti (SC), Kahalgaon, Bhagalpur, Sultanganj, Nathnagar, Mokama, Barh, Bakhtiarpur, Digha, Bankipur, Kumhrar, Patna Sahib, Fatuha, Danapur, Maner, Amarpur, Dhauraiya (SC), Banka

The following constituencies would vote from 7:00 to 15:30:
Alauli (SC), Suryagarha, Tarapur, Jamalpur, Katoria (ST), Belhar, Sikandra (SC), Jamui, Jhajha, Chakai

The Banka Lok Sabha seat was also chosen in a by-election following the death of Digvijay Singh.

Phase V
35 seats were voted for. The following constituencies would vote from 7:00 to 17:00:
Sandesh, Barhara, Arrah, Agiaon (SC), Tarari, Jagdishpur, Shahpur, Hisua, Nawada, Warsaliganj, Gaya Town, Belaganj, Atri, Wazirganj, Sheikhpura, Barbigha, Asthawan, Biharsharif, Rajgir (SC), Islampur, Hilsa, Nalanda, Harnaut,

The following constituencies would vote from 7:00 to 15:00:
Rajauli (SC), Gobindpur, Arwal, Kurtha, Jehanabad, Ghosi, Makhdumpur (SC), Bodh Gaya (SC), Phulwari (SC), Masaurhi (SC), Paliganj, Bikram

Phase VI
26 seats were voted for. The following constituencies would vote from 7:00 to 17:00:
Brahampur, Buxar, Dumraon, Rajpur (SC), Ramgarh, Mohania (SC), Kargahar, Nokha, Obra, Aurangabad

The following constituencies would vote from 7:00 to 15:00:
Bhabua, Chainpur, Chenari (SC), Sasaram, Dinara, Dehri, Karakat, Goh, Nabinagar, Kutumba (SC), Rafiganj, Gurua, Sherghati, Imamganj (SC), Barachatti (SC), Tikari

Parties
National Democratic Alliance (NDA)

 Bharatiya Janata Party (BJP)
 Janata Dal (United) (JDU)

 RJD/LJP alliance

 Rastriya Janata Dal
 Lok Janshakti Party

 United Progressive Alliance (UPA)

 Indian National Congress (INC)

 Left Front

 Communist Party of India

 Others

 Janata Dal (Secular)

Candidate issues
Some key candidates were the NDA Assembly Speaker Uday Narayan Chaudhary, an RJD leader Shakil Ahmed Khan who was competing with JDU's Vinod Yadav, JDU Chhedi Paswan against RJD's Niranjan Ram, a former Union minister Kanti Singh against the BJP incumbent Rameshwar Prasad, Awadesh Narain Singh against RJD's Iliyas Hussain and Anil Kumar against RJD's Bagi Kumar Verma.

The final round's important race was that of a senior RJD leader Jagdanand Singh's son Sudhakar Singh, who was a candidate for the BJP against the RJD's Ambika Yadav. Singh campaigned against his son saying: "Sudhakar is my biological son but Ambika is my political heir." The JDU's Mahabali Singh's son Dharmendra also contested for the opposition RJD. Other family affairs were the JDU's Sushil Singh's older brother Sunil Singh, who was competing for the RJD.

Campaign

Bihar Chief Minister Nitish Kumar said his party has nothing in common with its coalition partner the BJP, and that the decision not to have the Gujarat Chief Minister Narendra Modi campaign in Bihar was made by the BJP alone and not him after a rift over Modi's earlier visit and the return of funds from Gujarat for relief work following the 2008 Bihar flood. He also said there was no possibility of having an alliance with the INC.

The BJP attacked the INC and its former allies, saying they would lose the election because "There is nothing but [a] NDA wave perceptible in Bihar and Nitish Kumar will once against return to power with [a] two-thirds majority." Their coalition partner and CM Kumar also attacked the INC as being responsible for Bihar's "backwardness."

The JDU's Sharad Yadav attacked the INC's General Secretary Rahul Gandhi, who was campaigning for the party's Bihar campaign: "What does Rahul Gandhi know about politics? Somebody wrote on the paper and gave it to you and you read it out. We are an unfortunate country. He should be thrown into the Ganga." He also blamed Gandhi for "indulging in dynastic politics."

Gandhi also controversially said that "Aapki Congress party gareebon ki party hai, aapki party hai."["Your Congress party is the party of the poor, your party."]

Poll
The media suggested that the ruling NDA was likely to have a slight increase in seats from the previous election. The NDA previously won just one seat in Buxar but looked to make bigger gains in this election from the district with the JDU's Dawood Ali facing the JDS' Dadan Pahalwan. The constituencies of Rohtas, Kaimur, Aurangabad, and Gaya were expected to tilt towards the NDA.

The opposition RJD-LJP alliance was expected to benefit from the "anti-incumbency factor" against such NDA candidates as Choudhary, Chhedi Paswan, and Awadhesh Narain Singh.

October 2010 opinion poll:

Controversy
Following the BJP's issuance of tickets for the election, its Bihar president, C.P. Thakur, was summoned to the party's national headquarters to explain his decision. He had not opted to campaign during the elections and resigned from his post in the party after his son, Vivek Thakur, was not given representation on the party ticket.

A low turnout was expected in the Naxal-affected districts, according to the election commission. This followed a Naxal boycott call in several districts. The first five phases saw an average of 52% voter turnout. The final phase recorded 51% despite concerns that it would have a low turnout and be a "real test if the 'Nitish factor'" worked following CM Nitish Kumar's appeal: "Good voter turnout alone is the point to ponder in this phase. Crowd presence at several meetings had been a good indicator though."

Violence
Two days before the second phase of voting naxals triggered a land mine in Sheohar district killing six policemen. As a result, the district's voting centers would close 2 hours earlier. The attack was seen as a resurgence in Naxal activity after a lull due to its timing during an election. Though the Naxals had called for a boycott of the polls, the second phase ended largely unscathed.

On the fourth phase of voting more bombs were set off. In the morning Naxals were responsible for a bomb blast near a bridge on the Chakai-Jamui road in the Batia jungle. Later on "anti-social elements" set off another bomb in the Danapur Assembly constituency wounding 2 people. On the eve of the fifth phase of voting, the naxals called for a 24-hour bandh. During the bandh, security services attempted to defuse a bomb planted by the naxals, however 2 bomb disposal personnel were killed.

Days before the final phase of voting a Naxal boycott was enforced with a bombing of a bridge and another attack that killed near the Chenari Assembly constituency, which was due to vote during the final phase. On the final day of voting 1 person was killed and 2 were injured when bomb exploded in a cinema hall, 2 others were also killed trying to defuse a bomb. A bomb plated to disrupt the final day of voting in Aurangabad district was found the following day, however, the police apparently left the live bomb unattended; as a result 8 children were killed when it exploded and villagers blamed the police, following which the district magistrate arrived and announced compensation of Rs. 100,000 for each of the dead.

Areas in Sonbhadra and Chandauli districts in Uttar Pradesh, near the border with Rohtas and Bhabhua districts in Bihar, were sealed due to the final phase of voting. The Imamganj constituency, which is apparently "simmering [with] tension" over Naxal activity was seen as a security challenge. It also had a quiet campaign. Shiv Shankar Singh, a confidant of the Bihar Assembly Speaker, Uday Narayan Chaudhary, of the constituency said: "There will be no election campaigning in the interiors. Who will take the risk? Public meetings were held only in block headquarters of Dumaria, Imamganj, and Banker Bazar." There were also posters calling for a poll boycott in the days leading up to the poll. Some reports, however, said the constituency is safer now than a decade ago.

Despite the violence, the Chief Election Commissioner S.Y. Quraishi said this was "the most peaceful election ever [held in Bihar]."

Electoral code violations
First information reports were filed against the head of the RJD, Lalu Prasad Yadav, and his wife Rabri Devi for violating the Election Commission of India's model code of conduct for having brought their own security personnel into the polling booth in Dinapur of Digha constituency in the provincial capital Patna. An FIR was also filed against Bihar's JDU Transport Minister Ram Nandan Singh for having taken two guards into the polling booth while casting his vote in the Parbatta constituency of Khagaria district.

Results
There are a total of 243 seats, with 38 reserved for Scheduled Castes (SC) and 2 for Scheduled Tribes (ST). A total of 875 candidates, including 43 women, stood in the election.

The Lok Sabha by-election for Banka was won by Putul Kumari, an independent candidate.

Summary

|-
! colspan="2" rowspan="2" width="150" |Parties and Coalitions
! colspan="3" | Popular vote
! colspan="3" |Seats
|-
! width="70" | Vote
! width="45" | %
! width ="50"| +/-
! Contested
! Won
!+/-
|-
| style="background-color: " |
|Janata Dal (United) 
|6,561,906
|22.58
|2.15
|141
|115
|27
|-
| style="background-color:" |
|Bharatiya Janata Party
|4,790,436
|16.49
|0.81
|102
|91
|36
|-
| style="background-color: " |
|Rashtriya Janata Dal
|5,475,656
|18.84
|4.61
|168
|22
|32
|-
| style="background-color: " |
|Lok Janshakti Party
|1,957,232
|6.74
|4.35
|75
|3
|7
|-
| style="background-color: " |
|Indian National Congress
|2,431,477
|8.37
|2.29
|243
|4
|5
|-
|style="background-color: " |
|Communist Party of India
|491,630
|1.69
|0.4
|56
|1
|2
|-
| style="background-color: " |
|Jharkhand Mukti Morcha
|176,400
|0.61%
|
|41
|1
|1
|-
|style="background-color:grey"|
|Independents
|3,842,812
|13.22
|
|1342
|6
|4
|-
| colspan="8" bgcolor="#E9E9E9"|
|- style="font-weight:bold;"
| align="left" colspan="2"| Total
| 29,058,604
| 100.00
| bgcolor="#E9E9E9"|
| 243
| 100.00
| ±0
|-
! colspan="8" |
|-
|colspan="9"| Source: Election Commission of India
|}

Results by Constituency 
The following is the list of winning and nearest lost candidate in 2010 Bihar legislative assembly election.

See also
List of constituencies of Bihar Legislative Assembly
2015 Bihar Legislative Assembly election

References

External links
 Observers list for Bihar Assembly Elections 2010
 Constituencywise Result Status (all candidates listed)

2010
2010
2010 State Assembly elections in India